Henki is a 2021 collaborative album by the English singer-songwriter Richard Dawson and the Finnish experimental rock group Circle. The album has seven songs that are all related to the life of plants and trees. The title, according to Circle's Jussi Lehtisalo, is a Finnish word meaning "spirit" or "ghost". The collaboration between Dawson and Circle started with the exchange of demos, and then they met in Pori, a city on Finland's West Coast where Circle are based. The COVID-19 pandemic and the 2020 lockdown meant the album had to be finished remotely.

Meaning 
"Methuselah" tells the story of Donald Rusk Currey's cutting down of Prometheus, the world's oldest tree. "Lily" tells of a hospital nurse in Newcastle who witnesses paranormal events after the death of patients, including the appearance of a room full of flowers.

Reception 

Critics thought well of the album. Louis Pattison, writing for Pitchfork, gave the album 7.5 out of 10, and said, "In a catalog already noted for strangeness, Henki might be Richard Dawson's strangest album to date. But his ideas are fertilized by these songs' peculiar twists and turns; the more Dawson and Circle lean into their eccentricities, the more their music resonates. Whatever Dawson writes about, he's really writing about people—the ways we choose to live our lives, and the strange and awful things that befall us along the way. Henki blows up these themes into widescreen, unfolding across continents, centuries, and even the afterlife." Phil Mongredien, writing for The Guardian, highlighted "Silene" and "Methuselah": "A sprawling epic written from the perspective of a seed and a lament for an ancient tree are highlights on this inspired collaboration".

Year-end lists

Track listing
 "Cooksonia"
 "Ivy"
 "Silphium"
 "Silene"
 "Methuselah"
 "Lily"
 "Pitcher"

References

2021 albums
Richard Dawson (musician) albums
Circle (band) albums